Thick as a Brick 2, abbreviated TAAB 2 (pronounced  by Anderson) and subtitled Whatever Happened to Gerald Bostock?, is the fifth studio album by Jethro Tull frontman Ian Anderson, released in 2012 as a follow-up of Thick as a Brick, Jethro Tull's 1972 parody concept album. It entered the Billboard chart at No. 55.

Concept overview
According to Anderson, TAAB 2 (which he pronounces ) focuses on Gerald Bostock, the fictional boy genius author of the original album, forty years later. "I wonder what the eight-year-old Gerald Bostock would be doing today. Would the fabled newspaper still exist?" The follow-up album presents five divergent, hypothetical life stories for Gerald Bostock, including a greedy investment banker, a homosexual homeless man, a soldier in the Afghan War, a sanctimonious evangelist preacher, and a most ordinary man who (married and childless) runs a corner store; by the end of the album, however, all five possibilities seem to converge in a similar concluding moment of gloomy or pitiful solitude. In March 2012, to follow the style of the mock-newspaper cover (The St Cleve Chronicle and Linwell Advertiser) of the original Thick as a Brick album, an online newspaper was set up, simply titled StCleve.

Reception

AllMusic gave three stars to the album, calling it: "cleaner and streamlined, not as indulgent or idealistic as [Anderson's] younger work, boasting a more sensible structure, yet it still bears all of his signatures from the flute to rambling folk-rock".

The album debuted at No. 55 on the Billboard chart, at No. 13 in the German Albums Chart, at No. 12 in the Finnish Album Chart, at No. 19 in the Austrian Album Charts, at No. 30 in the Norwegian Album Charts, at No. 31 in the Swiss Album Charts, at number No. 74 on the Canadian Albums Chart, at No. 35 on the UK charts, at No. 76 in the Dutch Album Chart and at No. 99 on the Spanish charts.

Live performances

Anderson performed the entire album live on tour in 2012. In August 2014, Jethro Tull's Ian Anderson released CD/DVD/Blu-ray Thick as a Brick - Live in Iceland. The concert was recorded in Reykjavík, Iceland on 22 June 2012 and featured complete Thick as a Brick and Thick as a Brick 2 performances by the Ian Anderson Touring Band.

Track listing 
The original Thick as a Brick consists of only two long tracks comprising a single song, while the TAAB 2 lists 17 separate songs merged into 13 distinct tracks (some labelled as medleys), although also all flowing together much like a single song.

DVD 

The 2-disc edition includes a DVD-9 with the following contents:

Audio:
5.1 Surround Mix
Super Quality 24-bit Stereo Mix
Video:
TAAB2 "The making of" Video
Studio recording sessions, interviews and more
The Lyric Reading Video (Anderson)
DVD-ROM:
Multilingual Lyric Translations (pdf files)
www.StCleve.com Web Pages (pdf)

Personnel
Musicians
 Ian Anderson – vocals, flutes, acoustic guitars
 Florian Opahle – electric guitar
 John O'Hara –  accordion, Hammond organ, piano, keyboards
 Pete Judge – trumpet, flugelhorn, tenor horn, E-flat tuba
 Ryan O'Donnell – additional vocals
 David Goodier – bass guitar, glockenspiel
 Scott Hammond – drums, percussion 
Production
 Steven Wilson – mixing engineer
 Mike Downs – recording engineer
 Ian Anderson – liner notes
 Peter Mew – mastering engineer

Charts

See also 
 Thick as a Brick
 Thick as a Brick - Live in Iceland

References

External links
 Ian Anderson's announcement
 
 Parish Newspaper for St. Cleve, Linwell, and Little Cruddock (formerly St. Cleve Chronicle)
 Smolko, Tim. Jethro Tull's Thick as a Brick and A Passion Play. Bloomington: Indiana University Press, 2013.

Ian Anderson albums
2012 albums
Concept albums
Chrysalis Records albums
Albums produced by Ian Anderson
Sequel albums